Jessop is a surname, and may refer to:

 Bob Jessop (born 1946), British Marxist theoretician
 Carolyn Jessop (born 1968), American author
 Charles Minshall Jessop, mathematician
 Christine Jessop, Canadian child murdered in 1984
 Clytie Jessop, British actress
 Craig Jessop, American academic
 Elisha Jessop (1843–1918), Canadian doctor and politician
 Flora Jessop, American social activist
 Gilbert Jessop (1874–1955), English cricketer
 Gilbert Jessop (cricketer, born 1906), his son, also an English cricketer
 Graham Jessop (born 1957), English marine archaeologist
 Greg Jessop, fictional character from the British soap opera EastEnders
 Job Dean Jessop (1926–2001), American thoroughbred jockey
 Keith Jessop (born 1933), English salvage diver
 Peter Jessop (born 1964), American film actor
 Violet Jessop (1887–1971), ocean liner stewardess and Titanic survivor
 William Jessop (1745–1814), English civil engineer
 Willie Jessop, leader of Fundamentalist Church of Jesus Christ of Latter Day Saints

See also 
 Jessop & Company
 Jessops

Surnames
English-language surnames
Surnames of English origin
Surnames of British Isles origin